Subhan Raza Khan, also known as Subhani Mian, is former head of a Sufi centre popularly known as Dargah-e-Ala Hazrat, shrine of his great-great grandfather Ahmed Raza Khan, in Bareilly, India. He is chairperson of the Manzar-e-Islam seminary. He also edits the Urdu-language Ala Hazrat monthly magazine which is published in Dargah.
His son Ahsan Raza Khan Qadri has been appointed present head of the Dargah Ala Hazrat.

In 2015 during a protest against illegal encroachment on Waqf properties, he called Samajwadi Party founder-patron Mulayam Singh Yadav an " RSS agent".

See also
 Ahmad Raza Khan
 Mustafa Raza Khan Qadri
 Hamid Raza Khan
 Akhtar Raza Khan
 Hassan Raza Khan

References

External links 
Official website of Dargah Ala Hazrat

Ahmed Raza Khan family
People from Bareilly
Indian people of Pashtun descent